New Hampshire's 24th State Senate district is one of 24 districts in the New Hampshire Senate. It has been represented by Democrat Debra Altschiller since 2022.

Geography
District 24 covers most of the state's Atlantic coastline in Rockingham County. The district is entirely located within New Hampshire's 1st congressional district. It borders the state of Maine.

Rockingham County - 18% of county

 Rye
 North Hampton
 Hampton
 Hampton Falls
 South Hampton
 Exeter
 Greenland
 Stratham

Recent election results

2022

Elections prior to 2022 were held under different district lines.

Federal and statewide results in District 24
Results are of elections held under 2022 district lines.

Historical election results

2020

2018

2016

2014

2012

References

24
Rockingham County, New Hampshire